Raam is a Kannada language romantic comedy movie released in 2009 directed by K. Madesh starring Puneeth Rajkumar and Priyamani, who making debut in Kannada cinema. Harikrishna is the music director for the movie. It is the remake of 2008 Telugu film Ready.

Plot
Ram (Puneeth Rajkumar), a final year B.E student studying in Bellary comes to visit his joint family in Mysore in the vacation. His cousin's marriage is fixed. But his cousin loves another NRI Boy (Chethan Kumar). Knowing this Raam helps his cousin to get her married to her lover. His uncle gets angry and throws him out of the house. He goes back to his university. He sees a girl (Priyamani) and falls in love at first sight. His friend gets depressed on losing his lady love as her parents disapproved their marriage and fixed her marriage with another boy. Ram decides to bring her and get her married to her friend.  He goes to R.R. Kalyana Mantapa kidnaps the bride unconscious and brings her. And later gets to know that he has kidnapped the wrong bride. When Ram saw the girl he becomes happy for it was the girl Pooja (Priyamani) he loved. When she gained conscious she is extremely happy as she did not wanted to get married. She forces Ram and his Friends to leave her to the Bus stand. To escape from the goon Ram and pooja gets lost in the forest. They find the way out of the forest and leaves her to the Bus Stand where he meets his friend. They leave Pooja and carry on. She calls her friend and gets to know that it takes 15 days for her visa to get ready. She is depressed. Some goons follow her. She runs. Ram and his friend  rescue her. He tells her to stay in his house by lying to them that she is an orphan and Shastri who is Ram's family friend brought her up in his ashrama. She tells the same to Ram's family. Later Ram apologises to his uncle and comes back. Love blossoms between them. Elders decides to get them married. They take her to Shastri's ashrama to talk about the marriage proposal with him. While some Men take her away in spite of being protected by Ram's family members. Later Ram tells the truth about what was going on. They decide to help Pooja. The people who take Pooja away are attacked  by some other men. The other Man take her away. Raam beats him from his back and he is unconscious. She tells him her story. Pooja's father's 2 sisters were married to Pooja's mother's brothers. The 2 brothers get separated due to a property fight. And Pooja grows up in America And she is the sole heiress of 100 crores. Her parents die in an accident. Then she comes to India to live with her uncles. But come to know that the 2 brothers are separated. The 2 brothers want to get their sons married to Pooja for her money. Both fight for this. By that time Ram had kidnapped her from marriage hall. After knowing this Ram promises her that he will marry her in the presence of her uncles without violence using his brain. He joins her uncles house as an accountant. Ram's uncle and aunt comes in disguise as Chicago Chandrashekar and his wife and asks for Pooja's uncle's son for their nonexistent daughter. They tells him that they own 150 crores. Knowing this Pooja's uncle leaves Pooja for his brother's son. While Ram's parents come and in disguise as Dollar Dinesh who is Chicago Chandrashekar's brother and asks for Pooja's second uncle's son for their nonexistent daughter. Pooja's second uncle agrees. Ram's last uncle comes as Swiss Bank manager and lies that Pooja's father had taken a loan of 150 crore. Pooja's uncles decide to get her married to Ram as he had no money. They get her married to Ram in Grand manner. After the marriage they come to know the truth and regret their mistake and ask Pooja for forgiveness. Her uncles unite and bless the newly married couple and thank Ram and his family for teaching them a lesson and send Pooja with Ram and his family to Mysore.

Cast

Puneeth Rajkumar as Raam
Priyamani as Pooja
Rangayana Raghu as Mc Krishna Murthy
Doddanna as Dodda mallayya, Pooja's maternal first uncle
Sharath Lohitashwa as Chikka mallayya, Pooja's maternal second uncle
Srinath as Raghunath prasad, Ram's first uncle
Arun Sagar as Ramaa
Sundar Raj
M. S. Umesh
Padma Vasanthi
Sangeetha
Achyuth Kumar
Tilak Shekar
Dharma 
Shobhraj
Sadhu Kokila
Mohan Juneja 
Prakash Shenoy 
Jai dev 
Imran 
Kuri Prathap 
Nanda kishore 
Sadashiva brahmavar
Lakshmi hegde 
Shashikala
Rekha. V. Kumar 
Rani Dhamukumar 
Jyothi Gurucharan 
Malathi Sardeshpande 
Chithra Shenoy 
Apoorva 
Venkata Ram 
Mandeep Rai 
Dr. Nagesh kavati 
Ramesh Babu 
Sonu Gowda (cameo appearance)

Production

Soundtrack 

Soundtrack was composed by V. Harikrishna.

Reception

Critical response 

R G Vijayasarathy of Rediff.com scored the film at 3 out of 5 stars and says "Priyamani, who makes her Kannada debut through this film, plays a perfect foil to Puneet in the dance scenes. She looks charming in the film.  There is nothing special in Hari Krishna's songs, except for Hosa Gaana Bajaana and Neenendhare Nanage Ishta. Krishna Kumar's camera work is okay". B S Srivani from Deccan Herald wrote "The first half of the film is entertaining but begins running in circles soon after. Krishnakumar’s cinematography and the competitive spirit of Priyamani (who sometimes resembles a serious Jyothika) all make ‘Raam’ work. Never mind a small niggling problem. The story doesn’t register or connect easily, thanks to the pace. True film buffs make no distinction of language and will definitely enjoy ‘Raam’, who rams the viewer hard, leaving behind only two of Harikrishna’s tunes". A critic from The Times of India scored the film at 3 out of 5 stars and says "It is a treat to watch Puneeths brilliance in dialogue delivery and expressions. Priyamani makes a grand debut in Sandalwood with a lively performance. Rangayana Raghu is the cream of the team. Srinath, Arun Sagar, Sharath Lohithashwa, Doddanna, and Sundararaj excel. Music by V Harikrishna is melodious. Krishna Kumars camerawork is brilliant". A critic from Bangalore Mirror wrote  "There are the mandatory two good songs and four good fights. And missing is the hamming of Rangayana Raghu (this is a plus point). The rest of the cast have fixed roles. Raam is worth a watch if you can forgive the dull moments that arrive early on".

Release 
Movie opening was not good compare to previous Puneeth's films but picked up after 3Days Movie had Massive Houseful boards  in Bangalore, Mysore, Davangere and Bellary film grossed 20cr all over Karnataka. It completed 25 weeks.

References

External links
 

2009 films
Kannada remakes of Telugu films
Films scored by V. Harikrishna
Indian romantic comedy films
Films shot in Bangalore
2000s Kannada-language films
Indian slapstick comedy films
2000s masala films
Films set in Karnataka
2009 romantic comedy films